Parece Amor is the first album of Peruvian actress and singer Mayra, released in 2013.

Track listing

 "Parece Amor"
 "Pronto Regresará"
 "Horas"
 "Cállate"
 "Ya No Habrá Un Después"
 "Hasta El Fin De Los Mundos"
 "La Última Vez"
 "No Recuerdo"

References

2013 debut albums
Mayra Goñi albums